Thunder Bay—Superior North (formerly known as Thunder Bay—Nipigon) is a federal electoral district in Ontario, Canada, that has been represented in the House of Commons of Canada since 1976.

It is in the northwestern part of the province of Ontario. It was created in 1976 as "Thunder Bay—Nipigon" from parts of Port Arthur and Thunder Bay ridings. It was renamed "Thunder Bay—Superior North" in 1998.

It consists of the eastern part of the Territorial District of Thunder Bay including the northern part of the city of Thunder Bay, Ontario.

13.7% of the population of the riding are of Finnish ethnic origin, the highest such percentage in Canada.

This riding lost a fraction of territory to Thunder Bay—Rainy River and gained territory from Algoma—Manitoulin—Kapuskasing during the 2012 electoral redistribution.

Demographics
According to the Canada 2016 Census
Ethnic groups: 80.4% White, 15.8% Indigenous
Languages: 84.0% English, 4.9% French, 2.4% Italian, 2.2% Finnish, 1.0% Ojibway
Religions (2011): 72.4% Christian (38.1% Catholic, 8.1% United Church, 7.5% Anglican, 6.9% Lutheran, 1.8% Presbyterian, 1.3% Baptist, 1.2% Pentecostal, 7.5% Other), 26.0% None. 
Median income: $35,824 (2015) 
Average income: $45,304 (2015)

Geography

Thunder Bay—Superior North consists of the part of the Territorial District of Thunder Bay
lying east of a line drawn from the northern limit the territorial district due south to the northeast corner of the Township of Bulmer, and south along the eastern boundaries of the townships of Bulmer, Fletcher, Furlonge, McLaurin and Bertrand, east along the 6th Base Line, south along longitude 90o00( W, Dog River and the western shoreline of Dog Lake, west, along the north, west and south boundaries of the Township of Fowler, south along the Kaministiquia River, east along the northern limit of the Township of Oliver Paipoonge, south along its eastern limit and along Pole Line Road, north along Thunder Bay Expressway (Highways 11 and 17), east along Harbour Expressway and Main Street to 110th Avenue, then due east to the eastern limit of the City of Thunder Bay, along that limit to the northeast corner of the Township of Neebing, then southeast to the US border;  and
 excluding the part lying south and east of a line drawn from the southwest corner of the Township of Downer due west to a line drawn due south from the southeast corner of the Township of Bain, due south to a line drawn due west from the southwest corner of the Township of McGill, due east to longitude 86o00( W, south along that longitude, and west along the White River to Lake Superior.

Members of Parliament

This riding has elected the following Members of Parliament:

Election results

Thunder Bay—Superior North

Note: Conservative vote is compared to the total of the Canadian Alliance vote and Progressive Conservative vote in 2000 election.

Note: Canadian Alliance vote is compared to the Reform vote in 1997 election.

Thunder Bay—Nipigon

See also
 List of Canadian federal electoral districts
 Past Canadian electoral districts

References

Notes

External links
Riding history 1976-1987 from the Library of Parliament
Riding history 1988-2008 from the Library of Parliament
 2011 results from Elections Canada
 Campaign expense data from Elections Canada

Ontario federal electoral districts
Politics of Thunder Bay